The Palacio Legislativo Federal (Federal Legislative Palace) was a never-completed building for the legislative bodies of the Mexican Federal Republic.

History
By the end of the 19th century, the government of President Porfirio Díaz, decided the congress needed an emblematic and proud building to house the Chamber of Deputies and the Senate. Inspired by the Reichstag building of the German Empire, the administration called for an international competition in which several famous architects of Europe and Mexico participated. Despite declaring a winner, the government decided to appoint a new architect to draw a completely new design.

The final project is a creation by Émile Bénard. When the Mexican Revolution broke out in 1910, the new president, Francisco I. Madero, changed the building's functions and name to Palacio de los Tres Poderes (Palace of the Three Powers) to be the offices of not only the legislative, but also the executive and judicial powers of the republic.

Post-Revolution

The chaos of the revolution deflected attention and resources away from the project, and only the foundations and the iron structure were completed. The building remained standing and rusting until the 1930s when it was finally decided to destroy the erected structure. However, the cupola was saved and turned into the Monumento a la Revolución (Monument of the Revolution) by Carlos Obregón Santacilia, and the massive structure stands today as a mausoleum to the heroes of the Mexican Revolution.

References

Palaces in Mexico
Unfinished buildings and structures